Karayazı is a town and district of Erzurum Province in the Eastern Anatolia region of Turkey. The population is 4,724 (as of 2010).In March 2019 Melike Göksu (HDP) was elected mayor. On 17 September 2019 she was dismissed and arrested due to a sentence of 7 years and 6 months for terrorist propaganda. Kaymakam Mesut Tabakçıoğlu was appointed as a trustee instead.

Notable Locals 

 Hozan Canê (*1971), German-Kurdish singer

References

Populated places in Erzurum Province
Districts of Erzurum Province
Kurdish settlements in Turkey